The Libón River is a river of Hispaniola. It forms part of the international border between the Dominican Republic and Haiti.

See also
List of rivers of the Dominican Republic
List of rivers of Haiti

References

Rivers of Haiti
Rivers of the Dominican Republic
Dominican Republic–Haiti border
Border rivers